Love Madness is a 1920 American silent crime film directed by Joseph Henabery and starring Louise Glaum, Matt Moore, and Noah Beery.

Plot
As described in a film magazine review, Mary Norwood's husband, a weakling, is framed by a gang of crooks and sent to prison to die for a murder he has not committed. His wife, believing implicitly in his innocence, assumes the role of a confidence woman, gets in with the gang, learns the truth by playing one gang member against the other for her affections. She has them arrested and frees her husband, who has become regenerated  through the ordeal and emerges a bigger and better man.

Cast

References

Bibliography
 Connelly, Robert B. The Silents: Silent Feature Films, 1910-36, Volume 40, Issue 2. December Press, 1998.

External links

 

1920s American films
1920 films
1920 crime films
1920s English-language films
American silent feature films
American crime films
American black-and-white films
Films directed by Joseph Henabery
Pathé Exchange films
Films distributed by W. W. Hodkinson Corporation